Jazmín Zepeda Burgos (born 1 May 1976) is a Mexican politician from the Party of the Democratic Revolution. From 2003 to 2006 he served as Deputy of the LIX Legislature of the Mexican Congress representing Guerrero.

References

1976 births
Living people
Politicians from Mexico City
Women members of the Chamber of Deputies (Mexico)
Party of the Democratic Revolution politicians
21st-century Mexican women politicians
Deputies of the LIX Legislature of Mexico
Members of the Chamber of Deputies (Mexico) for Guerrero